Taiwo Daniel Ojo (born 17 February 2001) is an Italian professional footballer who plays as a defender for National League South club Billericay Town.

Career
Having come through the Charlton Athletic academy, Ojo joined Yeovil Town in June 2017 signing a youth scholarship deal. On 6 November 2018, Ojo made his debut for Yeovil in an EFL Trophy 4–0 group stage victory against West Ham United under-23s. In December 2018, Ojo was awarded his first professional contract with Yeovil committing him to the club until June 2021. On 23 February 2019, Ojo made his English Football League debut in a 1–0 victory over Cambridge United.

In September 2019, Ojo joined Southern League Division One South club Melksham Town on loan until January 2020.

On 10 January 2020, Ojo left Yeovil after the club reluctantly agreed to mutually terminate his contract to allow him to be closer to his home in London.

On 26 August 2021, Ojo signed for National League South side Billericay Town. and joined Cheshunt F.C. on a dual loan registration deal.

Career statistics

References

External links
Daniel Ojo profile  at the Yeovil Town F.C. website

2001 births
Living people
Italian footballers
Italian people of Nigerian descent
Italian sportspeople of African descent
Association football defenders
Charlton Athletic F.C. players
Yeovil Town F.C. players
Melksham Town F.C. players
Dulwich Hamlet F.C. players
Cheshunt F.C. players
Billericay Town F.C. players
English Football League players
National League (English football) players
Southern Football League players
Isthmian League players
Sportspeople from Parma
Footballers from Emilia-Romagna